The 2013 Dollar General 300 was the 30th stock car race of the 2013 NASCAR Nationwide Series and the 32nd iteration of the event. The race was held on Friday, October 11, 2013, in Concord, North Carolina at Charlotte Motor Speedway, a 1.5 miles (2.4 km) permanent quad-oval. The race took the scheduled 200 laps to complete. At race's end, Kyle Busch, driving for Joe Gibbs Racing, would complete a late-race pass on eventual third-place driver, Penske Racing's Sam Hornish Jr., to win his 62nd career NASCAR Nationwide Series win and his 11th win of the season. To fill out the podium, Austin Dillon of Richard Childress Racing would finish third.

Background 

The race was held at Charlotte Motor Speedway, located in Concord, North Carolina. The speedway complex includes a 1.5-mile (2.4 km) quad-oval track that was utilized for the race, as well as a dragstrip and a dirt track. The speedway was built in 1959 by Bruton Smith and is considered the home track for NASCAR with many race teams based in the Charlotte metropolitan area. The track is owned and operated by Speedway Motorsports Inc. (SMI) with Marcus G. Smith serving as track president.

Entry list 

 (R) denotes rookie driver.
 (i) denotes driver who is ineligible for series driver points.

Practice

First practice 
The first practice session was held on Thursday, October 10, at 2:00 PM EST, and would last for an hour and 20 minutes.

Second and final practice 
The second and final practice session, sometimes known as Happy Hour, was held on Thursday, October 10, at 6:10 PM EST, and would last for 50 minutes.

Qualifying 
Qualifying was held on Friday, October 11, at 4:05 PM EST. Each driver would have two laps to set a fastest time; the fastest of the two would count as their official qualifying lap.

Six drivers would fail to qualify: Josh Wise, Joey Gase, J. J. Yeley, Dexter Stacey, Danny Efland, and Derrike Cope.

Full qualifying results

Race results

Standings after the race 

Drivers' Championship standings

Note: Only the first 10 positions are included for the driver standings.

References 

2013 NASCAR Nationwide Series
NASCAR races at Charlotte Motor Speedway
October 2013 sports events in the United States
2013 in sports in North Carolina